Christoff Bryan (born 26 April 1996) is a Jamaican high jumper. He established himself globally in age category competitions with a bronze medal at the 2013 World Youth Championships in Athletics and a fourth-place finish at the 2014 World Junior Championships in Athletics.

He won a gold medal at the 2012 Central American and Caribbean Junior Championships in Athletics in San Salvador. He broke the Jamaica Issa Boys&Girls Championships High Jump record on March 16, 2013 earning him a gold medal for himself and Wolmer's Boys High School.

Personal bests

Competition record

References

External links

1996 births
Living people
Jamaican male high jumpers